Vladimir Kozlov (born March 7, 1958) is a Soviet  Ukrainian bobsledder who competed in the late 1980s. At the 1988 Winter Olympics in Calgary, he won two medals with a gold in the two-man event and a bronze in the four-man event.

References
 DatabaseOlympics.com profile

 

1958 births
Bobsledders at the 1988 Winter Olympics
Living people
Russian male bobsledders
Soviet male bobsledders
Olympic bobsledders of the Soviet Union
Olympic gold medalists for the Soviet Union
Olympic bronze medalists for the Soviet Union
Olympic medalists in bobsleigh
Medalists at the 1988 Winter Olympics